Scopula phyletis is a moth of the  family Geometridae. It is found in South Africa and Zimbabwe.

References

Moths described in 1913
phyletis
Moths of Africa